Aq Taqeh-ye Qadim (also Romanized as Āq Taqeh-ye Qadīm; also known as Āq Toqeh-ye Qadīm) is a village in Maraveh Tappeh Rural District, in the Central District of Maraveh Tappeh County, Golestan Province, Iran. At the 2006 census, its population was 27, in 7 families.

At Old Aq Toqeh is a modern mausoleum for the Turkmen poet Makhtumqoli Faraghi which was inaugurated in 1999 in the presence of Turkmenistan president Saparmyrat Niyazov and Iranian minister of culture Ata'ollah Mohajerani.

References 

Populated places in Maraveh Tappeh County